Pimpale Khalsa is a village in the Shirur taluka of Pune district in Maharashtra, India. Pimple Khalsa is other variation for the same name.

References 

Villages in Pune district